Declan Quigley is a broadcaster and journalist from Ireland.

Career
He is the chief motorsport writer for the Irish Independent, Ireland's largest circulation daily newspaper, and has been the lead commentator for Setanta Sports TV's coverage of the Formula One world championship since 2005.

Quigley began commentating on cycle racing for Eurosport in 2013. He replaced David Harman who was on holiday. He has also been the pit lane reporter for RTÉ TV's coverage of Grand Prix racing from 1997 to 2004.

He is a keen amateur racer and has raced successfully in Formula Ford and Formula Vee.

References

External links
 Setanta Sports
 Irish Independent
 Motor Sport Vision

Year of birth missing (living people)
Living people
Irish Independent people
Irish sports broadcasters
Motorsport announcers
RTÉ television presenters
Cycling announcers